The 2014–15 Pac-12 Conference men's basketball season began with practices in October 2014 and ended with the 2015 Pac-12 Conference men's basketball tournament in March 2015 at the MGM Grand Garden Arena in Paradise, Nevada. The regular season began on the first weekend of November 2014, with the conference schedule starting in December 2014.

This was the fourth season under the Pac-12 Conference name and the 56th since the conference was established under its current charter as the Athletic Association of Western Universities in 1959. Including the history of the Pacific Coast Conference, which operated from 1915 to 1959 and is considered by the Pac-12 as a part of its own history, this is the Pac-12's 100th season of men's basketball.

Preseason

 October 23, 2014 – Pac-12 Men's Basketball Media Day, Pac-12 Networks Studios, San Francisco, California.

() first place votes

Rankings

Pac-12 regular season

Conference Schedule
This table summarizes the head-to-head results between teams in conference play.

Head coaches

Sean Miller, Arizona
Herb Sendek, Arizona State
Cuonzo Martin, California
Tad Boyle, Colorado
Dana Altman, Oregon
Wayne Tinkle, Oregon State

Johnny Dawkins, Stanford
Steve Alford, UCLA
 Andy Enfield, USC
Larry Krystkowiak, Utah
Lorenzo Romar, Washington
Ernie Kent, Washington State

Postseason

Pac-12 tournament

The conference tournament is scheduled for Wednesday–Saturday, March 11–14, 2015 at the MGM Grand Garden Arena, Paradise, Nevada. Arizona, and Oregon were seeded one and two respectively. The top four teams had a bye on the first day, March 11. Teams were seeded by conference record, with ties broken by record between the tied teams followed by record against the regular-season champion, if necessary.

NCAA tournament

National Invitation tournament

College Basketball Invitational

Awards and honors
 The Pac-12 Coach of the Year Award in both men’s and women’s basketball is now known as the John Wooden Coach of the Year Award.

Scholar-Athlete of the Year
 Chasson Randle, Sr., Stanford

Player-of-the-Week

All-Americans

Delon Wright, Utah, First team (Sporting News), second team (United States Basketball Writers Association)
Joe Young, Third team (Sporting News)

All-Pac-12 teams

Voting was by conference coaches:
Player of The Year: Joe Young, Oregon
Freshman of The Year: Stanley Johnson, Arizona
Defensive Player of The Year: Gary Payton II, Oregon State
Most Improved Player of The Year: Josh Hawkinson, Washington State
John R. Wooden Coach of the Year: Dana Altman, Oregon

First Team

Pac-12 All-Freshman Team

Pac-12 All-Defensive Team

USBWA
The United States Basketball Writers Association (USBWA) named the following from the Pac-12 to their All-District Teams:
District VIII
Player of the Year: Delon Wright, Utah

All-District Team
Askia Booker, Colorado
Delon Wright, Utah

District IX
All-District Team
 Norman Powell (UCLA)
 Stanley Johnson (Arizona)
 T. J. McConnell (Arizona) 
 Tyrone Wallace (California) 
 Joe Young (Oregon)
 Chasson Randle (Stanford) 
 Gary Payton II (Oregon State)

NABC All-District 20 Team
National Association of Basketball Coaches (NABC) named the following to their All-District 20 team:
First Team
 Joe Young (Oregon) 
 Delon Wright (Utah)
 Chasson Randle (Stanford) 
 T. J. McConnell (Arizona)
 Stanley Johnson (Arizona)

 Second Team
Norman Powell (UCLA)
 Tyrone Wallace (California) 
 Gary Payton II (Oregon State)
Kevon Looney (UCLA)
 Askia Booker (Colorado)

References